Currently, there are three defined types of public roads in the Republic of Moldova:

 National road ( –  Drumuri naționale)
 Local road ( –  Drumuri locale)
 Street ( –  Străzi)

Its current road network is inherited from the former Soviet Union (the Moldavian SSR). As one of the poorest countries in Europe, Moldova is the only country which requires use of vignettes (roviniete) on all public roads, inside and outside localities, as a form of road tolling. Vignettes are available for purchase at border crossing points, and drivers caught without a valid vignette are charged with cash fines between €125 and €375.

Motorways

As of 2021, there are no segments of motorway that are officially open. The first motorway-class road in Moldova is planned to be the Chișinău - Cimișlia motorway, which is to be assigned "M3". Works on what could be the first motorway began in the 80s (under Soviet rule), but began to slow down after the dissolution of the Soviet Union in 1991, stopping in 1996 with the Chișinău - Porumbrei segment open only on one carriageway. Works on what could eventually become the first motorway in Moldova resumed in 2019.

Thus, it can be said that Moldova has de facto  of motorway in service, but de jure the Chișinău - Porumbrei segment does not count as a motorway, with plans calling for the Chișinău - Cimișlia road to receive motorway status only after works are finished.

In 2021, it had been proposed by the IDEP that the motorway segment between Chișinău and the Romanian border become a "national priority" for Moldova.

National roads
National roads in Moldova are divided into two categories: magistral roads and republican roads. Magistral roads mainly serve as connections to road networks of neighboring countries, those of Romania and Ukraine. Republican roads serve as connections between places in Moldova, but may also reach the border. All magistral roads start or pass through the capital city of Chișinău, with the exception of the M4.

M1 highway

The M1 links Chișinău to the Romanian capital of Bucharest and further Romanian cities via the Leușeni-Albița border checkpoint.

M2 highway

The M2 is one of the magistral roads that link Chișinău to the border with Ukraine. There's no bridge over the Dniester river in the area, however this gap is covered by a ferry.

M3 highway

The M3 serves as a connection between Chișinău and the Moldova–Romania border; this time towards the proposed Lower Danube metropolitan area (which includes the Romanian cities of Galați and Brăila) via the autonomous territory of Gagauzia. The main cities crossed by the road include Cimișlia, Comrat and Vulcănești, ending near the tripoint of Moldova and its two surrounding countries at Giurgiulești.

Future plans call for the Chișinău - Cimișlia section to become a motorway-class road, the first motorway in Moldova.

M4 highway

The M4 is the only road that doesn't start or pass through Chișinău and of which all segments are in the control of the Transnistrian government. The road forms the backbone of the Transnistrian road network as it links all the main cities located in the territory: Tiraspol, Dubăsari and Rîbnița, with its northern terminus at the border with Ukraine.

M14 highway

It passes through the three most populous Moldovan cities (Chișinău, Bălți and Tiraspol), as well as Edineț.

The designation "M14" dates back to the era of the Soviet Union. The Soviet M14 highway served as a link between the present-day border with Poland at Brest (Byelorussian SSR) and the city of Odessa (Ukrainian SSR) on the Black Sea coast. After the dissolution of the Soviet Union in 1991, the designation of the former M14 was retained on the Moldovan section, while the sections in Ukraine and Belarus have gotten new designations.

M21 highway

The M21 is the second connection between Chișinău and the border with Ukraine.

List

Local roads
In Moldova, local roads mainly serve as links between district administrative centers and villages/communes located in the specific district, as well as between one village/commune and another. They are maintained by the appropriate local authorities depending on their location, previously being maintained by the national state-owned company Administrația de Stat a Drumurilor (ASD) until 2017. Since then, the ASD solely maintains national roads, with the exception of those located in Transnistria.

European routes
European routes (E-roads) passing through the Republic of Moldova:
 Class A: 
: (Austria, Slovakia, Ukraine, Romania) - Ungheni - Călărași - Chișinău - Tiraspol - (Ukraine, Russia)
: (Ukraine) - Palanca - (Ukraine) - Giurgiulești - (Romania, Bulgaria, Turkey)
 Class B:
: (Romania) - Leușeni - Chișinău - Tiraspol - (Ukraine)
: (Romania) - Sculeni - Bălți - Edineț - Otaci - (Ukraine)
: (Ukraine) - Dubău - Dubăsari - Chișinău - Cimișlia - Comrat - Giurgiulești - (Romania)

Transnistria
As an autonomous territory with limited recognition as an independent state, the authorities of Transnistria, which is internationally recognized as part of Moldova, have complete control of all road segments that pass through the breakaway territory. The M4 highway, which crosses Transnistria on the north–south reference, is in complete control of Transnistria, as well as parts of M14 and M21, and many segments of republican and local roads. The complete length of the Transnistrian road network totals .

References

External links

Moldova
Moldova transport-related lists
 
Lists of buildings and structures in Moldova